Adele Duttweiler (29 December 1892 – 27 May 1990) was a Swiss philanthropist and the wife of Gottlieb Duttweiler, founder of both the Migros group and the LdU political party.

Early life 
Adele Bertschi was born on 29 December 1892 in Horgen on Zürichsee lakeshore. Her mother was Maria, née Antille, her father was Samuel, who had emigrated to the US, where he founded a ribbon weaving mill. When his first wife died, he returned as a "made man" back to Switzerland. He married Maria Antille, who originates from the Canton of Valais. The couple moved to Horgen, where they acquired the "In Rüsler" farm where Adele grew up. Her father died when Adele was at the age of eight years. Adele's mother was described as a purposeful and spirited woman who had to cope with all sorts of harassment after the early death of her man. She struggled successfully against all odds, a character trait that Adele owed to her mother. After primary school in Horgen, Adele graduated from the then usual "Welschlandjahr" for young women – a longer stay in western Switzerland to learn the French language, mostly as domestic help. She then worked as an employee of ETH Zürich in the seeds control department.

Adele and Gottlieb Duttweiler 
As employee of ETH Zürich, Adele Bertschi drove daily by train from Horgen to Zürich. Around the year 1911, a handsome, young, well-dressed man from Rüschlikon began to sit down opposite the rather shy young acting 19-year-old woman, annoying Adele: "He looked at me with big eyes. I was not really happy, I was still almost a child. But probably just my reticence has irritated him not to give up." When his courtship seemed to show no result, he tried a hackney. As soon as he had learned to ride, he visited his beloved at her home in Horgen. Unfortunately, his appearance attracted more impression to Adele's mother and sister. The mother then invited the imposing but somewhat uncertain tab for lunch. Adele Duttweiler expressed concerns where they seemed attached to her, even in quite commercial matters. He listened to their advice, and his in-the-future-thinking was always added by Adele's sense of the reality of the presence.

In 1912 the then 24-year-old Gottlieb and the almost 20-year Adele celebrated their engagement, and on 29 March 1913, the wedding took place. Thus the entirely unusual, almost half a century lasting life and work of two people began, whose work has helped to shape Switzerland sustainable in the twentieth century.

Migros 

In 1923 Gottlieb and Adele Duttweiler went to Brazil but had to return to Switzerland in 1924 because of a serious illness of Adele. Then they settled down again in Rüschlikon where the present Migros group was founded in 1925. In 1941 Gottlieb and Adele Duttweiler transferred ownership of Migros to their customers, as a cooperative. In 1946 they passed over their estate to the Im Grüene foundation, and the Park im Grüene was opened to the public in 1947.

The park area comprises the former Langenhalden estate of Adele and Gottlieb Duttweiler, who gave over the spacious area of their estate to the public use in 1946/47 – hence the admission is free, according to Duttweiler's social understanding. The accordingly Im Grüene foundation was established on 24 December 1946. The foundation's assets include the  Langhalden estate and an endowment. At the time the foundation was established, the donation had a total value of 520,000 Swiss Francs, which after adjusting for inflation is equal to about 2.6 million Swiss Francs today. The Foundation was tasked to make the Langhalden estate available to the general public as a place of recreation. The donor's intentions were realised by turning the estate into the «Im Grüene» Park (known locally as «Dutti-Park»).

The cargo ship Adele of the Reederei Zürich AG was named after her in 1952. In 1950 respectively in 1957, Adele and Gottlieb Dutweiler established the Adele und Gottlieb Duttweiler Stiftung to ensure the future work of the Migros chain as a cooperative according to the founding act.

Adele-Duttweiler-Preis 
On 2 July 1974 the Adele-Duttweiler-Preis was awarded for the first time. The award includes prize money of 50,000 Swiss Francs and was initiated by the 12 regional Migros cooperatives, which decided in 1972 to mark the 80th birthday of Adele Duttweiler to donate a prize, to recalls Adele Duttweiler's selfless work. The foundation was established on 9 October 1973 and periodically honours individuals, organizations or institutions who have rendered outstanding services in the social field.

Late life and death 

Adele Duttweiler was nominated by her home community Rüschlikon as an honorary citizen on 19 January 1974. On 31 August 1984 the Kurklinik für Erfahrungsmedizin, Al Ronc opened in Castaneda in the Canton of Grison. The present Paracelsus Clinica al Ronc is a health clinic for medical experience that was initiated by Adele Duttwiler. On her 95th birthday she learnt that the Migros cooperative Migros-Genossenschafts-Bund (MGB) bought her husband's birthplace at Strehlgasse 13 in Zürich. Adele Duttweiler survived her husband by 28 years and died on 27 May 1990 at the age of 97 at her home in Rüschlikon. The burial at the cemetery in Rüschlikon, alongside her husband, was followed by a funeral service in the Fraumünster church, which was filled to the last seat. Jules Kyburz, chairman of the board MGB, portrayed with moving words Adele Duttweiler's life and work, and Reverend Peter Vogelsanger called and remembered the life stages of this unusual woman.

Aftermath 
The orange rose Adele Duttweiler was named after her in 2014. The Adele-Duttweiler-Preis for people and organizations that have been particularly active in the social sphere is awarded annually.

See also 
 Adele (1952 ship)
 Park im Grüene

Literature 
 Alfred A. Häsler: Adele Duttweiler-Bertschi. Ein Jahrhundert-Leben. Edition M, Zürich 1993.

References

External links 

 Adele-Duttweiler-Stiftung on the Migros website 

1892 births
1990 deaths
20th-century Swiss businesswomen
20th-century Swiss businesspeople
20th-century philanthropists
Migros people
People from Horgen
Rüschlikon
Swiss philanthropists
Swiss women company founders